Paschalis Staikos  (born 8 February 1996) is a Greek professional footballer who plays as a defensive midfielder for Super League 2 club Panserraikos.

Career
He plays mainly as a defensive midfielder, though he has tried in several positions. He was Panathinaikos U-20 team's captain. He debuted in the first team on 7 June 2015 at the match Atromitos - Panathinaikos 2–0, for the playoffs.

OFI
On 31 August 2019, OFI officially announced the signing of the young midfielder, until the summer of 2021. 

Roughly a year later, Staikos signed a contract extension, until the summer of 2023.  His first goal for the club came in a 2-1 away defeat against Panetolikos, on 3 January 2021.  Four days later, he converted a penalty in a 2-0 home win against Lamia.

Career statistics

Club

References

External links
pao.gr
UEFA.com

1996 births
Living people
Greek footballers
Greece under-21 international footballers
Greece youth international footballers
Panathinaikos F.C. players
OFI Crete F.C. players
Panserraikos F.C. players
Super League Greece players
Association football midfielders
Footballers from Drama, Greece